Pyramid Hill or Tai Kam Chung (literally: Large Golden Bell) is a peak in eastern New Territories of Hong Kong. With a height of 536 metres (1,759 ft), it stands among the highest mountains in Hong Kong. The mountain is located inside Ma On Shan Country Park, between Ma On Shan and Sai Kung. Its pyramidal shape lends the hill its name.

Gallery

See also 

 List of mountains, peaks and hills in Hong Kong
 Ma On Shan - tallest peak in Ma On Shan Country Park
 Ngong Ping, Ma On Shan

References 

Sha Tin District
Tai Po District